Skieblewo  is a village in the administrative district of Gmina Lipsk, within Augustów County, Podlaskie Voivodeship, in north-eastern Poland, close to the border with Belarus.

External links
 Web, which tells about Skieblewo's history.

References

Skieblewo